Artem or Artyom Mikhaylovich Tarasov (4 July 1950, Moscow — 22 July 2017, Moscow) was a Russian businessman and political activist of Armenian descent.

Biography
Tarasov was a descendant of a well-known family of Armenian traders. Oil industrialist and dandy Nikolai Tarasov (1882–1910), co-founder of Moscow Bat theatre, and Henri Troyat (Lev Tarasov) are among his paternal relatives. Born to a photographer father and academic mother, Tarasov received several degrees as an engineer, a computer scientist, and an economic planner. He had a successful career as a scientific manager. His company, Progress, was the tenth co-operative officially registered in Moscow, but it was shut down by the Moscow authorities as “amoral, dangerous to society and contrary to socialist principles”. Then he founded his next successful co-operative, Technika. Tarasov was the co-founder of Kommersant daily newspaper, the first independent airline, Transaero, and was elected to the Russian parliament. After a conflict with Soviet officials in 1990, he left the USSR and settled in London. In 1993, he returned to Russia and was once again elected to the State Duma. In 1996, he decided to run for Presidency as an independent pro-business candidate, but his application was rejected by the Central Election Commission.

By the late 2000s Tarasov was spending most of his time in London. In 2005, his book, Millionaire, detailing the rise of post-Soviet oligarchs, was published.

Tarasov died in Moscow on 22 July 2017.

References

Links 
 Official site
 The first millionaire of the USSR from rb.ru – 
 Interview with Artyom Tarasov from Gazeta.ru – 
 Артём Тарасов: Миллионер Из Трущоб "Artem Tarasov: Slumdog Millionaire", from Interview Magazine – 

Russian people of Armenian descent
1950 births
2017 deaths
First convocation members of the State Duma (Russian Federation)
Businesspeople from Moscow
Russian political activists
Yabloko politicians
Russian businesspeople in the United Kingdom
Moscow State Mining University alumni
Soviet businesspeople